The National Republican Party, also known as the Anti-Jacksonian Party or simply Republicans, was a political party in the United States that evolved from a conservative-leaning faction of the Democratic-Republican Party that supported John Quincy Adams in the 1824 presidential election.

Known initially as "Adams-Clay Republicans" in the wake of the 1824 campaign, Adams's political allies in Congress and at the state-level were referred to as "Adams's Men" during his presidency (1825–1829). When Andrew Jackson became president, following his victory over Adams in the 1828 election, this group became the opposition, and organized themselves as "Anti-Jackson". The use of the term "National Republican" dates from 1830.

Henry Clay served as the party's nominee in the 1832 election, but he was defeated by Jackson. The party supported Clay's American System of nationally financed internal improvements and a protective tariff. After the 1832 election, opponents of Jackson coalesced into the Whig Party. National Republicans, Anti-Masons and others joined the new party.

History 

Before the election of John Quincy Adams to the presidency in 1825, the Democratic-Republican Party, which had been the only national American political party for over a decade, began to fracture, losing its infrastructure and identity. Its caucuses no longer met to select candidates because now they had separate interests. After the 1824 election, factions developed in support of Adams and in support of Andrew Jackson. Adams politicians, including most ex-Federalists (such as Daniel Webster and Adams himself), would gradually become members of the National Republican Party; and those politicians that supported Jackson would later help form the modern Democratic Party.

After Adams's defeat in the 1828 election, his supporters regrouped around Henry Clay. Now the "anti-Jackson" opposition, they soon organized as the National Republican Party. Led by Clay, the new party maintained its historic nationalistic outlook and desired to use national resources to build a strong economy. Its platform was Clay's American System of nationally financed internal improvements and a protective tariff, which would promote faster economic development. More important, by binding together the diverse interests of the different regions, the party intended to promote national unity and harmony.

The National Republicans saw the Union as a corporate, organic whole. Hence, the rank and file idealized Clay for his comprehensive perspective on the national interest. Conversely, they disdained those they identified as "party" politicians for pandering to local interests at the expense of the national interest. The party met in national convention in late 1831 and nominated Clay for the presidency and John Sergeant for the vice presidency.

Formation of the Whig Party

The Whig Party emerged in 1833–1834 after Clay's defeat as a coalition of National Republicans, along with Anti-Masons, disaffected Jacksonians and people whose last political activity had been with the Federalists a decade before. In the short term, it formed the Whig Party with the help of other smaller parties in a coalition against President Jackson and his reforms.

National Republican presidents 
John Quincy Adams was the only president to come from the National Republican Party.

Electoral history

Presidential tickets

Congressional representation

See also 
 Era of Good Feelings
 Second Party System

Footnotes

Further reading
 Michael F. Holt. The Rise and Fall of the American Whig Party: Jacksonian Politics and the Onset of the Civil War. New York. Oxford University Press. 1999.
 Carroll, E. Malcolm. Origins of the Whig Party. Durham, NC. Duke University Press. 1925.
 Robert V. Remini. Henry Clay: A Statesman for the Union. New York. W. W. Norton and Co. 1992.

1824 establishments in the United States
1834 disestablishments in the United States
Political parties established in 1824
Political parties disestablished in 1834
Defunct conservative parties in the United States
National Republican
Political parties in the United States
Conservatism in the United States